Shu•bi•dua or Shu-bi-dua is a Danish pop group that was formed in 1973 in Copenhagen, as an expansion of the group Passport. Throughout their 40-year history, Shu-bi-dua changed their lineup many times, however their lead singer  was with the band throughout, except for a gap between 1984 and 1987. They have produced many well-known hits in Denmark, like Vuffeli-vov, Hvalen Hvalborg, Står på en Alpetop, Stærk Tobak (to the music from the Phil Medley and Bert Russell song Twist and Shout), Familien kom til Kaffe, Sexchikane, We wanna be free, and many more. 

Their musical style owed much to folk and Central European schlager, but the core was always light rock. They are the Danish band with most selling albums in Denmark, more than 6 million per 2022. Notable characteristics were word plays and humour, but also often with serious backgrounds - like, sexual harassment or life in general. In a Youtube video about the history of the band Bundesen and Hardinger were asked at the end to name a song that represents the band best. Bundesen named "Den røde tråd", a comical but still autobiographical song about his development from working class poverty to find "your place in the sun." Even in the 2000s, the band was able to get the audience to sing along with the first verse.

History
The group was extended with the singer Michael Bundesen and keyboard player , and under the name Shu-bi-dua released the single Fed Rock/Tynd Blues, before the group again as Passport released the single Change of the Guard/Highway of Living. Shu-bi-dua was originally thought of as a one-off group, but when the debut single produced the hit Fed Rock, they chose to keep it.

As Shu-bi-dua they quickly gained success, and the name Passport was dropped. In 1974 they released their first self-titled album Shu-bi-dua.
One reason for their success was their often humorous translations of rock classics, made with great care and accuracy, and often with a refined sense of wordplays in their Danish lyrics (largely untranslatable to English). They did, however, also compose music of their own, often straightforward, with simple and catchy tunes, easy to sing, high party energy often built in - several of their hits from the 1970'es are still regular party classics today, with their laid back, energetic style. Some lyrics were intelligent, like "hvalen Hvalborg", about a deceased and stuffed whale friend. Others were simple and/or silly, like "where are the keys" (that's the song's only line), but all their songs are done with great care for detail.
The group also ventured into other projects, like the movie "the red cow" (a major flop) or the Shu-Bi-40 Christmas album with reggae versions of various Christmas songs and carols, and an underlying story about the sale of the Virgin Islands (Saint Creux, Saint John and Saint Thomas) to the US, in which everybody completely forgot the little (fictitious) island of Saint Hans - which also happen to be the name of a Danish mental institution.

After the first album, Poul Meyendorf left the group and was replaced by Claus Asmussen, who was a sound engineer on the first.
Since then the group has had numerous changes in its lineup. Claus Asmussen replaced Poul Meyendorff in 1975,  replaced Niels Grønbech in 1977,  replaced Jens Tage Nielsen, and  replaced Bosse Hall Christensen in 1981. In 1984 Michael Bundesen left the group to become station chief on the Copenhagen TV station Kanal 2, and simultaneously Kasper Winding left to be replaced by Paul Callaby. In 1987  was made a permanent member in the group when Willy Pedersen left. Thorup had been singing backup vocals since Shu-bi-dua 11 in 1985. In 1987 Michael Bundesen returned as lead singer, while  also joined the band. In 1988  replaced Paul Callaby as drummer, and shortly thereafter Søren Jacobsen left the band again. After having made the film Den røde tråd in 1989, they went on a sabbatical until their return in 1992 with the hit single Sexchikane. In the intervening years their back catalog was rereleased on CD in 1990, and in 1991 a Best Of album by the name Stærk Tobak was released. In connection to this they played live in front of 50,000 people on Bellevue Beach. In 1997 Michael Hardinger left the band after 24 years. In 2003 their 30th anniversary was celebrated with a 10-CD set called Shu-bi-dua 200 (each CD had 20 songs). In 2005 Claus Asmussen left Shu-bi-dua having been the only original continuous member in the group's 30-year history. The group has, since 2011, been on an indefinite hiatus, since lead singer Michael Bundesen suffered a brain embolism. Michael Bundesen, the focal point of the group, was born May 12, 1949 and died on November 8, 2020.

Lineup
Last line-up (2011)
 Michael Bundesen (vocals), 1973–1984, 1987–2020 (died November 8)
 Kim Daugaard (bass/vocals), 1977–
 Peter Andersen (trommer/vocals), 1988–
 Ole Kibsgaard (guitar/vocals), 1997–
 Jacob Christoffersen (keyboard/vocals), 2001–

Previous members
 Michael Hardinger (guitar/vocals), 1973–1997 (+ lyrics/composer and guest musician in 2005)
 Poul Meyendorff (guitar), 1973–1974
 Niels Grønbech (bass), 1973–1977
 Bosse Hall Christensen (Drummer), 1973–1981 (+ lyrics 1985)
 Jens Tage Nielsen (keyboard), 1973–1981
 Claus Asmussen (guitar/vocals), 1975–2005
 Kasper Winding (Drummer), 1981–1984
 Willy Pedersen (keyboard), 1981–1986
 Paul Callaby (Drummer), 1984–1988
 Jørgen Thorup (keyboard/vocals), 1987–2001
 Søren Jacobsen (keyboard/guitar), 1987–1988

Discography

Studio albums 
1974: Shu-bi-dua
1975: Shu-bi-dua 2
1976: Shu-bi-dua 3
1977: Shu-bi-dua 4
1978: 78'eren
1979: Shu-bi-dua 6
1980: Shu-bi-dua 7
1982: Shu-bi-dua 8
1982: Shu-bi-dua 9
1983: Shu-bi-dua 10
1985: Shu-bi-dua 11
1987: Shu-bi-dua 12
1992: Shu-bi-dua 13
1993: Shu-bi-dua 14
1994: Shu-bi-40
1995: Shu-bi-dua 15
1997: Shu-bi-dua 16
2000: Shu-bi-dua 17
2005: Shu-bi-dua 18 (Peaked in DEN: #2)

Compilations and live releases 
1975: Shu-bi-dua's værste
1978: Leif i Parken
1981: Duernes bedste
1985: Da mor var dreng
1988: 32 Hits
1991: Stærk tobak!! (3-CD set)
1992: Vi finner oss ikke i sexsjikane (Norwegian)
1994: Live og glade dage
1996: 15 skarpe skud, 1996
1997: 40 bedste
1998: Shu-bi-læum 73–98
2001: Rap jul og godt nytår
2003: Shu-bi-dua 200 (Peaked in DEN: #1)
2004: Symfo-ni-dua
2010: Shu-bi-dua 1–18 (Box) (Peaked in DEN #40)
Shu-bi-dua 1–9 (Box) (Peaked in DEN #2)
Shu-bi-dua 10–18 (Box) (Peaked in DEN #27)
2010: Live i Stockholm (download only)
2013: 40 Års Shu-bi-læum – De 40 Største hits (Peaked in DEN #2)(Certified gold)

Singles
2010: "Midsommersangen" (Peaked in DEN: #32)

References

External links
 Shu-bi-dua official homepage
 

Danish musical groups
1973 establishments in Denmark
2011 disestablishments in Denmark